Soccer Club Riverball is a football club from Joensuu in Finland.  The club was formed in 2006 and their home ground is at the Rantakylä.  The men's first team currently plays in the Kakkonen (Level 3 of the Finnish League System).  The Chairman of SC Riverball is Rauno Pasanen.

History

The club was established in 2006 and has played in the Central and Eastern Finland (Keski- and Itä-Suomi) section of the Kolmonen, (Third Division).  In 2009 SC Riverball finished in pole position and were promoted for the first time to the Kakkonen.

Club structure

SC Riverball runs 2 men's teams.  In addition the club has an active Veteran's Section and runs 4 teams at this level.

2010 season

SC Riverball Men's Team are competing in Group A (Lohko A) of the Kakkonen administered by the Football Association of Finland  (Suomen Palloliitto) .  This is the third highest tier in the Finnish football system.  In 2009 Soccer Club Riverball finished in first position in their Kolmonen section.

 SC Riverball/2 are participating in Section A (Lohko A) of the Nelonen administered by the Itä-Suomi SPL.

Current squad
as of 22 December 2012

Staff
Head coach
  Tuomo Santaharju
 									
Assistant coach
  Arpad Mester
										
Goalkeeper coach	
   Marko Karvinen

References

Sources
Official Website

Football clubs in Finland
Joensuu
2006 establishments in Finland